"West Hills College" may refer to one of the following:

 West Hills Community College District
 West Hills College Coalinga
 West Hills College Lemoore